Mabo may refer to:

Places

 Mabo, Togo, a village in Togo
Mabo Arrondissement, an area in Kaffrine Region, Senegal

People and related topics
 Eddie Mabo (1936–1992), the Torres Strait Islander man who instigated the 1992 test case for native title over his people's land
 Mabo (film), a 2012 Australian telemovie about Eddie Mabo's battle for Aboriginal land title rights
 Mabo v Queensland (No 1) (1988), court case striking down the Coast Islands Act under the Racial Discrimination Act 1975
 Mabo v Queensland (No 2) (1992), court case recognising native title in Australia for the first time
 Mabo: Life of an Island Man, a 1997 documentary film produced and co-directed by Trevor Graham
Bonita Mabo (1943–2018), Australian educator and activist, wife of Eddie
Gail Mabo (born 1965), daughter of Eddie and Bonita Mabo

See also

 Ma Bo (born 1947), Chinese writer

Mabo tofu, alternative spelling for mapo tofu, a Chinese dish from Sichuan